Joseph Francis McGeough (29 August 1903 – 12 October 1970) was an American prelate of the Catholic Church who worked in the diplomatic service of the Holy See.

Biography
Joseph McGeough was born on 29 August 1903 in New York City. He studied at the seminaries of the Archdiocese of New York and at the North American College in Rome. He was ordained a priest there on 20 December 1930. From 1931 to 1938 he did pastoral work in the Bronx and taught at a high school in Katonah, New York. He worked in the Roman Curia at the Congregation for the Oriental Churches from 1938 to 1943. He then moved to the Secretariat of State, where he assignments included organizing relief in Austria and Germany at the end of World War II.

On 9 May 1957, Pope Pius XII appointed him Apostolic Internuncio to Ethiopia.

On 17 September 1960, Pope John XXIII named him titular archbishop of Hemesa and Apostolic Delegate to Southern Africa. He received his episcopal consecration on 28 October 1960 from Pope John.

On 8 July 1967, Pope Paul VI appointed him Apostolic Nuncio to Ireland. He retired at age 65 for health reasons in March 1969; his successor Gaetano Alibrandi was appointed in April.

He died in a Manhattan nursing home after a long illness on 12 October 1970.

Notes

References

External links 
Catholic Hierarchy: Archbishop Joseph Francis McGeough 

1903 births
1970 deaths
People from New York City
Officials of the Roman Curia
Apostolic Nuncios to Ireland
Apostolic Nuncios to Ethiopia
Apostolic Nuncios to South Africa